An oroblanco, oro blanco (white gold), pomelit (Israel) or sweetie (Citrus maxima Merr. × C. Paradisi Macf.) is a sweet seedless citrus hybrid fruit similar to grapefruit. It is often referred to as oroblanco grapefruit.

Development
Oroblanco was developed as a cross between a diploid acidless pomelo and a seedy white tetraploid grapefruit, resulting in a triploid seedless fruit that is less acidic and less bitter than the grapefruit.

The oroblanco was patented by the University of California in 1981 after its development by Robert Soost and James W. Cameron at that university's citrus experiment station in Riverside, California. The nine-year project began in 1958 and led to a series of test plantings before a successful variation was refined.

Description

Oroblancos are either round- or oval-shaped with a thicker rind than grapefruit. When eaten, an oroblanco lacks bitterness associated with grapefruits and is rather sweet, even when the outer peel is still green, but the white membranes separating the fleshy segments are bitter and usually discarded.

Oroblancos are available from September through December. They may be peeled and eaten like an orange — by separating into segments — and are often eaten at breakfast.

A similar fruit has been commonly cultivated in Israel since 1984, from where the name "Sweetie" originated. It is also referred to as a "pomelit."

Gallery

References

External links
 Southern California has three fine locally adapted hybrids at their peak now: Oroblanco, Melogold and Cocktail. David Karp in Los Angeles Times
 UC, Davis
 Oregon Live

Growing tips
 Performance of `Oroblanco' and `Melogold' Pummelo × Grapefruit Hybrids on Nine Rootstocks on a Calcareous, Poorly Drained Soil
 How to Grow Oroblanco

Recipes
 Incredible Smoothies

Citrus hybrids
Grapefruit